In cricket, a player is said to have completed a century when he scores 100 or more runs in a single innings. The Cricket World Cup is the international championship of One Day International (ODI) cricket. The event is organised by the sport's governing body, the International Cricket Council (ICC), and is held once in every four years. As of the 2019 tournament, a total of 196 centuries have been scored by 117 players from 15 different teams. Players from all the teams that have permanent ODI status have made centuries. In addition, players from five teams that have temporary ODI status have scored centuries. The Indians have scored the most centuries (32), while Australia have the most centurions (15).

The first century in the championship was scored by Dennis Amiss of England when he made 137 against India in the 1975 World Cup. The same day New Zealand's Glenn Turner scored 171 not out against East Africa. It remained the highest individual total over the next two editions until Indian cricketer Kapil Dev scored 175 not out against Zimbabwe in 1983. Following that, the record was broken successively by Viv Richards (181) in 1987, Gary Kirsten (188 not out) in 1996, Chris Gayle (215) and Martin Guptill (237 not out) both in 2015. India's Sachin Tendulkar and Rohit Sharma hold the record for the highest number of centuries (six), and are followed by Australia's Ricky Ponting and Sri Lanka's Kumar Sangakkara with five each. Tillakaratne Dilshan, Sourav Ganguly, Mahela Jayawardene, AB de Villiers, David Warner and Mark Waugh are joint-third with four centuries each.

Rohit Sharma's five centuries in the 2019 tournament are the most by a player in a single tournament. Sangakkara scored four centuries in the 2015 tournament, while four players  Waugh (1996), Ganguly (2003), Matthew Hayden (2007) and Warner (2019)  have scored three centuries in a single tournament. Ireland's Kevin O'Brien holds the record for the fastest century (50 balls). In 1992, Andy Flower of Zimbabwe  making his ODI debut in a World Cup  scored a century. In the 2015 tournament 38 centuries were scored, while the 1979 competition had just two centuries.

As of 2015, six centuries have been scored in the finals; out of which five resulted in victories. Adam Gilchrist's 149 against Sri Lanka at the 2007 World Cup Final remains the highest individual score in a final; his 72-ball century is also the fastest in a final.

Key

Centuries

The list is arranged in chronological order. To sort this table by any statistic, click on the  icon on the column title.

Notes

References

Bibliography

 

 

World Cup
Centuries
World Cup
Centuries